Katherine Roberts is an English author.

Katherine Roberts may also refer to:

Katherine Roberts (television personality)
Kathryn Roberts (born 1974), English folk singer

See also
Kate Roberts (disambiguation)